Wilhelm  Ramsøe (7 February 1837 – 15 April 1895) was a Danish composer, musician and conductor.

Biography
Emilio Wilhelm Ramsøe  was born in Copenhagen, the second child of five. His father, Emilius Wilhelm Ramsøe (1807–1858) was a professional oboe-player; his mother was Anne (née Rasmussen) (1808–1889). He had four siblings, Kirstine (born 1833), Frederik (born 1840), Louis (born 1843), and Alvilda (born 1846). He was christened in 1837 at Garnison parish. Later the family moved to the area of Nørregade  in neighborhood of  Nørre Kvarter in Copenhagen.

Career
Ramsøe began playing violin at very young age. At 17 years old, he became conductor at actors guild for traveling theater companies; he conducted concerts in Denmark  and Norway. Between 1857 and 1864, he conducted several concerts and performances at the newly built 2,000-seat concert hall Alhambra which opened in 1857. It was during this time that Ramsøe established his reputation as a conductor and composer; this led to his appointment as music-director at the then  popular Folketheateret. From 1864 to 1875 he continued to conduct, while also composing and arranging various comedies. However, after a  difference of opinion  with the Folketheateret   theater director, Michael Wallem Brun (1819–91),  Ramsøe left the theatre and moved to Stockholm.

In approximately 1877, he moved to St Petersburg, first working as a viola player in the Italian opera orchestra, and later at the Bolshoi Theatre with the Russian opera orchestra.
In 1887 he was engaged as Royal  music director  at the Mikhaylovsky Theatre opera and ballet house.
He returned annually to Copenhagen for summer vacations and  conducted the symphonic wind band of  Rosenborg Brøndkuranstalt, which played every morning in Rosenborg park.

Marriage and later illness
On 5 September 1863, Ramsøe married Mathilde Marie Strandmann-Petersen (1841–1891) in Copenhagen.
His last years were plagued by bad health; he died in St. Hans Hospital, Roskilde. He was 58 years old.

Contributions
Ramsøe is today most known for:
5 quartets for Brass instruments (Op. 20, 29, 30, 37 & 38), that are all still in print.
Musical comedies: Gjöngehøvdingen, Svantevits Datter & Kanariefuglen, among others.
He also composed some smaller works, such as a few Lieder and a Romanze for viola and piano.

References

External links
 Salmonsens Konversationsleksikon, Band XIX, S. 906
 Brass Quartet scores at IMSLP 

1837 births
1895 deaths
People from Copenhagen
Danish male classical composers
Danish classical composers
Danish classical violinists
Danish classical violists
Danish conductors (music)
Male conductors (music)
Bolshoi Theatre
19th-century classical composers
19th-century Danish composers
19th-century male musicians
Male classical violinists